Gyeonggi Province is the most populous province in South Korea. It has been the subject of proposals to divide it into two provinces since 1987.

History of partition movements

20th century
During the 1992 South Korean presidential election, Kim Young-sam and Kim Dae-jung  made a promise to establish North Gyeonggi Province.

21st century
In 2014, the Council of Gyeonggi Province sponsored its partition, However this plan was opposed by the provincial governor Nam Kyung-pil.

See also
 Partition of California

References

Proposed political divisions
History of Gyeonggi Province
Partition (politics)